London French R.F.C. is a London-based Rugby Union club. It was founded in 1959 by interns at the Lycée Français Charles de Gaulle of London. The club has two XVs, with the first XV playing in Herts/Middlesex 2 following their relegation from Herts/Middlesex 1 at the end of the 2017–18 season.

Club Honours 
Middlesex 4 champions: 1993–94
Middlesex Senior Vase winners: 2003
Herts/Middlesex 3 champions (2): 2007–08, 2013–14

Notes

References

Rugby clubs established in 1959
1959 establishments in England
English rugby union teams
Rugby union clubs in London
French diaspora in Europe
Diaspora sports clubs in the United Kingdom